"Small Town Story" is a song by Chinese singer Teresa Teng.

"Story of a Small Town" is two minutes and 36 seconds long. Teng first recorded it for the 1978 Taiwanese film, The Story of a Small Town, directed by Li Hsing. As one of her hits, it helped her capture an international following. She performed the song at the Music Center of Los Angeles in 1980 when she became the first Chinese singer to perform there.

"Story of a Small Town" became popular in mainland China after the Cultural Revolution. It is one of Teng's most famous songs and has been covered by Asian musicians into the 21st century.

References

External links

Teresa Teng songs
1978 songs
1979 songs
Mandarin-language songs